Laurent Rondé (24 July 1666 – 22 March 1734), was the Crown Jeweller of France in the early 18th century. His most famous creation was the Crown of Louis XV, which he designed and manufactured and which was used as the coronation crown at the coronation of 1722 in Reims.

References 

1666 births
1734 deaths
French jewellers